
The Waldisee (or Waldiseeli) is a mountain lake, located south of Bisisthal, in the municipality of Muotathal, canton of Schwyz. It lies at a height of 1,406 metres, at the foot of the Alpler Stock. It has a maximum length of 420 metres.

See also
List of mountain lakes of Switzerland

References

Swisstopo topographic maps

External links
Waldisee on Hikr

Lakes of Switzerland
Lakes of the canton of Schwyz
LWaldisee